Huang Yingjie (1 March 1912 – 1999) was a Chinese sprinter. He competed in the men's 4 × 100 metres relay at the 1936 Summer Olympics. Prior to the Olympics, he set a new national record in the 110 meter hurdles, a record that stood for almost two decades.

References

External links
 

1912 births
1999 deaths
Athletes (track and field) at the 1936 Summer Olympics
Chinese male sprinters
Chinese male hurdlers
Olympic athletes of China